A split-flap display, or sometimes simply a flap display, is a digital electromechanical display device that presents changeable alphanumeric text, and occasionally fixed graphics.

Often used as a public transport timetable in airports or railway stations, as such they are often called Solari boards after Italian display manufacturer Solari di Udine, or in Central European countries they are called Pragotron after the Czech manufacturer.

Split-flap displays were once commonly used in consumer digital clocks known as flip clocks.

Description

Each character position or graphic position has a collection of flaps on which the characters or graphics are painted or silkscreened. These flaps are precisely rotated to show the desired character or graphic. These displays are often found in railway stations and airports, where they serve as flight information display system and typically display departure or arrival information.

Sometimes the flaps are large and display whole words, and in other installations there are several smaller flaps, each displaying a single character. 

Flip-dot displays and LED display boards may be used instead of split-flap displays in most applications. Their output can be changed by reprogramming instead of replacement of physical parts but they suffer from lower readability. They also can refresh more quickly, as a split-flap display often must cycle through many states.

Advantages to these displays include:
 high visibility and wide viewing angle in most lighting conditions
 little or no power consumption while the display remains static
 Distinct metallic flapping sound draws attention when the information is updated.

The Massachusetts Bay Transportation Authority has designed the new LED replacements for its aging Solari boards at North Station and South Station to emit an electronically generated flapping noise to cue passengers to train boarding updates.

Many game shows of the 1970s used this type of display for the contestant podium scoreboards. Usually, the flip was left-to-right on a vertical axis, although up/down on a horizontal axis was not completely unknown. Early seasons of the game show Family Feud used a split flap display as part of the game board (subsequent seasons used more modern digital displays, and eventually simply used a large digital flat screen monitor). The game board on the Nickelodeon game show Make the Grade was a 7x7 split-flap display, used to display subjects and wild cards, as well as tracking contestants' progress. The television game show Chain Reaction on Game Show Network features computer-simulated split-flap displays to display the various words in a chain.

In Italy, split-flap displays have also been occasionally used as destination signs for transit vehicles; there was also a brief vogue for them in the United Kingdom in the mid 1980s.

Operational boards in transport terminals and businesses

The boards are currently in use at the following stations:

Australia
 Melbourne Airport (Melbourne Tullamarine Airport, IATA Code MEL). Located in the Qantas First Lounge.
 Sydney Airport (IATA Code SYD). Located in the Qantas First Lounge.

Belgium 

 Brussels Airport (IATA Code BRU). Located in the main departure hall, displaying departures and check-in information. Very popular meeting point for people travelling together. (Was repaired after being damaged in the 2016 Brussels bombings, rather than being replaced, because of its high social and historical value.)

China

 Shanghai Starbucks Roastery. Lists the featured coffee beans on a split flap display installed by Solari di Udine S.P.A.

France

 Some railway stations in France still have one or several split-flap displays, Strasbourg, Nantes and Toulouse-Matabiau stations.

Germany

 Frankfurt Airport (Flughafen Frankfurt am Main, IATA Code FRA) has split-flap boards made by German manufacturer KRONE throughout terminal 1 of the airport, still in use . Each row ends with a pair of green and red lights which flash to indicate that flight is boarding. They indicate each flight's destination, its flight number and carrier, and its departure gate and time.
Platform split-flap displays were used across the Deutsche Bahn network, but have been almost completely replaced by liquid crystal displays.

Greece

 In Greece, these displays are still widespread. Most airports and train stations have one, most notably the Athens International Airport, which has two enormous displays of this kind. Bus stops, tram stops as well as the stations of the Athens Metro and the Proastiakos Commuter Rail System of Athens use electronic displays.

Hong Kong 

 Beef & Liberty in Hong Kong, Terminal 1 Hong Kong International Airport, Hong Kong. The 6Rx32C Oat Foundry Split Flap provides hungry travelers with a taste of 1960's travel nostalgia. The board flips every 3 minutes displaying messages and custom graphics such as hearts and burgers.

Hungary 
 Budapest Liszt Ferenc International Airport at its check-in and arrivals halls.
 Győr railway station

India
 Kolkata Airport. Was prevalent in old domestic and international terminals. Recently changed to a fully electronic display at the integrated airport.

Italy
Roma Termini. Boards located after the ticketing area above the track entrances. In addition, most RFI stations had split-flap display boards, now replaced by LED displays.
Milan Malpensa Airport. Board located in the check-in area.
Milan. Board located in the first italian Starbucks shop.
Trieste Airport. Board located in the check-in area.

Poland
 Warszawa Śródmieście railway station.
 Łódź Kaliska railway station. Boards located in the waiting hall, in passage under platforms 1-3 and on platforms 1, 2 and 3. Controlled with punch cards.
 Rybnik railway station
 Lublin Główny railway station

Pakistan
 Allama Iqbal International Airport Lahore.

Romania

Otopeni Airport (Bucharest Henri Coandă International Airport) has Solari boards in the international departure area, including a pair of red lights on each row which flash to indicate an important message such as "now boarding".
Traian Vuia Airport (Timișoara Traian Vuia International Airport) has a flip board for arrivals and departures in the main terminal area.
The central train station in Cluj-Napoca has Solari boards for departure and arrivals, including a pair of red lights on each row which flash to indicate "now arriving"/"now leaving". Each platform has its own Solari boards, each including an analog clock. The boards are well mentained and include "exotic" destinations for this station, such as Rome, Paris, Venice and other west-european destinations.

Serbia

Belgrade Airport (Belgrade Nikola Tesla Airport, IATA Code BEG) has Solari boards on both levels of the departure area, still in use as of November 2020. Each row ends with a pair of red lights which flash to indicate that the flight is boarding or there is some other change in status. They indicate which destination a flight is to, its flight number and carrier, and its departure gate and time.

Sri Lanka

Bandaranaike International Airport (Bandaranaike International Airport, also known as Katunayake International Airport and Colombo International Airport, IATA Code CMB). Disused split-flap displays can still be seen at departure gates (although LCD displays are now used). Large split-flap display in the arrivals hall still in use in early 2019.

Taiwan

Taipei Railway Station originally planned to remove both of its split-flap displays during a renovation in 2011. However, only one board was removed in answer to the call for preservation by local rail enthusiasts. , both split-flap and LED displays are available in the station and remain fully functional.

United Kingdom

 Samsung KX in Kings Cross Coal Yard, London, United Kingdom features an "L" Split Flap made by Oat Foundry. The Split Flap covers the walls surrounding the cafés order window. The board displays menu items and events happening in the Coal Yard.

United States

The lobby of the TWA Hotel at John F. Kennedy International Airport in New York City features a restored Solari board displaying historical flight information. The hotel lobby was originally in use as the 1962 Eero Saarinen designed TWA Flight Center, and most of the terminal's design features, including the Solari board, were kept and restored during the renovation of the Flight Center into the hotel.   
Seattle, Chicago, and New York City Starbucks Reserve Roasteries. Lists the featured coffee beans on a split flap display installed in 2017 by Solari di Udine S.P.A.
The Atlantic City Rail Terminal in Atlantic City, NJ retains a working board in the waiting area.
Jacksonville International Airport in Florida. It is on the second floor, in between the two check-in desks.
The National WWII Museum in New Orleans, LA has an operating split-flap display showing train departure schedules above a replicated railroad platform in the main atrium.
San Francisco Ferry Building. Located in the Great Nave, and a new installation (2013) rather than a hold-out from the pre-digital era.
Secaucus Junction in Secaucus, New Jersey. In the Upper Level Concourse.
Trenton Rail Station. Two sets of two side-by-side low profile boards, one on each side of over-track concourse. Served by all trains except River Line Light Rail. The boards have some electronic display elements (e.g. their clocks).
Nolita Hall in San Diego, California. A split-flap display shows menu items and flight schedules from behind the bar.
Pass and Stow in Citizens Bank Park, Philadelphia, Pennsylvania. The Split Flap pays homage to Philadelphia's old 30th Street Station Solari Board and acts as a real-time scoreboard during Philadelphia Phillies games.
Grow with Google in New York City. Displays information about schedules and events in the lobby of Grow with Google.
Pebble Beach Visitors Center.

Boards no longer in operation
Stations etc. previously equipped with these boards included, amongst others:

Australia

Caringbah railway station contains a disused board.

Canada

Montréal–Mirabel International Airport contained these boards, which were removed after the decommissioning of commercial passenger flights in 2004. Two departures boards are currently being restored and repurposed at Concordia University as a branch of the Montréal Signs Project helmed by Dr. Matt Soar.

Cyprus

Larnaca International Airport's old terminal contains these boards at both arrivals and departure gates. These boards remain in site after the closure of the terminal in 2009.

France

 The Gare de Versailles–Chantiers in Versailles replaced its split-flap display with flat screens in the late 2000s.

Hong Kong

Kai Tak International Airport used a split-flap display in the departure area until its closure in 1998.
Hung Hom station (Formerly Kowloon) used a split-flap display at the concourse until its renovation in 2001.
Stations along MTR Island line.

India

Chennai Airport used these in the entrance to its old domestic terminal, now closed.

Japan

Nagoya Airfield used to have at least one split-flap display when it was an international airport. Now that Chubu Centrair International Airport is the primary civil airport for Nagoya, a shopping centre called Airport Walk Nagoya on the grounds of the airport now prominently features an old split-flap display above the food court area, though the display is left static showing departures the airport used to have and is not functional.

North Macedonia

Skopje, Solari board above ticket office, displaying a range of destinations in Cyrillic, including former Yugoslavian destinations, such as Kosovo Polje (Косово поле) and Titov Veles (Титов Велес) as well as Western European destinations such as Dortmund (Дортмунд) and Paris Lyon (парис лион). This was out of use as of 2013, and as of August 2015, had been dismantled and dumped by the ticket office. The smaller Solari boards on the platforms are, as of August 2015, in site, but out of use.

The Netherlands

Since the 1980s, all railway stations in The Netherlands except those with very low passenger numbers had spit-flap displays on all platforms providing detailed information about the upcoming train. The larger railway stations also featured displays in this style near staircases and entrances, and the busiest stations had large overview displays in the main hall, e.g. at Amsterdam Centraal, Utrecht Centraal and Rotterdam Centraal. Between 2010 and 2012, they were all taken out of service. Most spit-flap indicators have been replaced by LCD displays, in some cases LED was used where direct sunlight would impact the readability too much.

Philippines

Terminal 1 of Ninoy Aquino International Airport (Manila International Airport) used the split-flap display until its renovation in 2015, when it was replaced by an electronic display.

Poland 

 Poznań Główny railway station, Solari board (see image) used in the hall of old station building and on platforms until 2012. Replaced by digital displays (see image 1, image 2).

Romania 

 Gara de Nord railway station had such a board showing destinations for trains that was removed in 2018, being replaced with a LED board. A previous board was replaced in the 1990s, which used to show destinations for other cities that were not serviced at the time, but were used in the 1980s.

Singapore

 Singapore Changi Airport (Singapore Changi Airport, IATA Code SIN) featured a board at Terminal 2 (Departures). The sign was taken down and replaced with a digital display in February 2020.

Spain

 Barcelona Sants train station.
 Madrid Chamartin railway station

Switzerland

 Aarau
 Bern
 Biel
 Brig (SBB display inside the main hall)
 Chur
 Fribourg
 Genève-Cornavin
 Genève-Aéroport
 Lausanne
 Luzern
 Neuchâtel
 Olten
 Winterthur
 Zürich HB

Thailand

In Bangkok, Don Muang International Airport’s Terminal 1 had three split-flap displays installed — two on a departures level, and only one on arrivals — all of which had been used until airport’s closure in 2006.

United Kingdom

 London Charing Cross, split into two sections with promotional images on destination blinds and up to two calling points per blind, operator shown below calling points, however as of 18 July 2007 these have now been dismantled and taken away to be replaced by the new LED boards like those used at Waterloo and Victoria.
 London Liverpool Street, taken out of service September 2007. A live webcam used to broadcast frequently updated images of this board, but was replaced by a cessation announcement in 2007. The board, pictured, was blue coloured, with one destination per blind, operator above calling points, and could show a range of special messages, including "Boat Train", "Special Service", "International", "Stansted Express" and "This train has been replaced by a substitute road service".
 London Victoria, replaced November 2004
 London King's Cross, replaced in the early 2000s
 Edinburgh Waverley, replaced by an LED departure board
 Glasgow Queen Street
 Glasgow Central
 Birmingham New Street, replaced by LCD screens. The large clock from the board survived above the gateline, with the remaining panels replaced by advertising until the station extension was opened in 2012.
 Manchester Piccadilly, replaced by LCD screen in 2001, as part of the station redevelopment. 
 Brighton, replaced by an LED display.  A substantial part of the board has been preserved by the Network SouthEast Railway Society.
 Reading
 London Waterloo, replaced by LCD units in the early 2000s, still there out of use until December 2006, when it was taken down to make way for an LED departure board that became operational in March 2007.
 London Paddington, was situated across the platforms and used to carry advertisements on the back, facing arriving passengers.
 Watford Junction, black coloured, full flip columns for Silverlink County services to Northampton, Southern services to Gatwick Airport, and Virgin Trains West Coast and First ScotRail services to North Wales, the North-West and Midlands of England and various destinations in Scotland. However, for Silverlink Metro services to London Euston and Silverlink County services to St Albans Abbey the calling points are fixed and only the time of the next train is changeable, because all trains call at the same stations.
 Woking
 Esher, removed in early 2000s. Controlled from ticket office

United States

Baltimore Penn Station. (replaced by LED board January 2010)
Boston South Station. Main lobby, one each for Amtrak and the MBTA, replaced in 2010 by a single LED one.
Dulles International Airport had a split-flap display from airport opening in 1962 until circa 1991, when the main terminal was expanded.
New Carrollton Amtrak Station. (Removed in January 2010.)
New Haven Union Station. Above stairway to platform concourse.  Combined Metro-North and Amtrak. Replaced on October 19, 2014, and donated to Danbury Railroad Museum.
New York City's Grand Central Terminal, replaced by LCD units made by Solari di Udine during reconstruction of the terminal.
New York City's Penn Station also featured these boards in both the Amtrak portion and the Long Island Rail Road (LIRR) portion. The board in the Amtrak portion, which showed departure information, was replaced in 2000 by an LCD board. The boards in the LIRR portion featured departing trains as well as boards at the head of each stairway to platforms for tracks 13 through 21, which displayed the stops and connections associated with the posted train. These were replaced over a period of several weeks between February and April 2006. The new signs, also made by Solari di Udine, use a combination of LCD and LED technology.
New York's Museum of Modern Art has a Solari flap display board in its permanent collection, on display in the design wing. The board itself works, and displays the original flight departure data for museum visitors (though reset to EST). The board was originally used in Milan's Malpensa Airport.
Newark Penn Station. In waiting area located above entrance to track concourse.  The board was taken out of service around 10/3/2014 and was replaced by a digital board that mimics the appearance and sounds of the board it replaced. The split-flap departure board was removed on 3/30/2015.

Philadelphia's 30th Street Station, lower level (Amtrak and NJ Transit) only. Mounted above centrally located information desk. Upper level (SEPTA Regional Rail) uses digital monitors. The Solari board at 30th Street Station was the last such board at an Amtrak station, as all the others were replaced with digital boards. On November 30, 2018, Amtrak announced that the Solari board at 30th Street Station would be replaced with a digital board in January 2019. Upon retirement, the Solari board was planned to be relocated to the Railroad Museum of Pennsylvania in Strasburg. However, on December 11, 2018, Amtrak announced it will reconsider its decision to replace the Solari board after Congressman Brendan Boyle contacted Amtrak CEO Richard H. Anderson and urged for the Solari board to remain at the station. Amtrak says it will incorporate the flipboard in the renovated 30th Street Station. The sign will be temporarily housed at the Railroad Museum of Pennsylvania until the 30th Street Station renovations are complete. Amtrak removed the Solari board on January 26, 2019. On February 28, 2019, the new digital board at 30th Street Station began operation. The Solari board from 30th Street Station has been on static display at the Railroad Museum of Pennsylvania since July 2019.
Providence Station. Located in waiting area, replaced in late 2016 in favor of digital monitors.

Non-informational uses
The aesthetic appeal of the displays is such that they have also seen use in purely artistic forms, such as in Pedestrian Drama, contemporary artwork using this display technology, and art by Juan Fontanive, who has used the mechanism extensively since 2005.

The album cover for The Enemy's album We'll Live and Die in These Towns is based on the Solari design seen at British railway stations.

Patents
  Remote-Controlled Display Device for Selectively Displaying Signs or Words

Gallery

References

External links

 Solari di Udine homepage
 SEGD Design Awards: A Sign of Democracy
 Software to simulate Split-flap signs
 Split-Flap Display Simulator
 Virtual Split-Flap Displays for Amtrak Stations
 Flip Clock

Display technology
Articles containing video clips